Love At Risk (stylised as Love@Risk) is a Mediacorp Channel 8 romance drama that will broadcast from 5 August 2013 to 30 August 2013 and consist of 20 episodes. It stars Tay Ping Hui, Joanne Peh, Kate Pang, Zhang Yao Dong, Xiang Yun & Shane Pow as casts of the series. The show aired at 9pm on weekdays and had a repeat telecast at 8am the following day.

Cast
Tay Ping Hui as Wu Qishan a.k.a. 573
Joanne Peh as Xin Si Si
Kate Pang as Liao Meihao
Zhang Yao Dong as Wang Li'an
Xiang Yun as Shi Sanmei
Shane Pow as Liao Yuanman
Tracy Lee as Wu Qiyu a.k.a. 571
Wee Kheng Ming as Hao Jiyi
May Phua as Lu Huiting
Hong Hui Fang as Fu Meili (Beauty Foo)
Brandon Wong as Hei-ge
Bryan Chan as Wang Yacai (Chicken King)
Priscelia Chan as Peng Nana
Ye Shi Pin as Xin Xiaotian
Tan Tiow Im as Xu Dadi
Hu Wensui as Benson

Trivia
Zhang Yao Dong's 2013 drama after Joys of Life in 2012.
Snippets of the next episode are shown during the ending credits of each episode.

Overseas broadcast
This drama is the twelfth drama on Malaysian satellite television Astro to be broadcast concurrently with Singapore, two weeks' behind the original telecast.

Awards & Nominations

Star Awards 2014
Love @ Risk is nominated for 2 awards in the Star Awards, for the Young Talent Award and Best Supporting Actress.

See also
List of programmes broadcast by Mediacorp Channel 8
List of Love At Risk episodes

References

Singaporean drama television series
Singapore Chinese dramas
Channel 8 (Singapore) original programming